Kushmurun is a brackish lake in the Kostanay Region, Kazakhstan.

Kushmurun is one of largest natural waterbodies of Kazakhstan. The western side of the catchment area of the lake has been converted to agricultural land, affecting biodiversity.

Geography
Kushmurun is an elongated fluvial lake located in the Turgay Basin. The lake stretches roughly from SSW to NNE and is crossed by the Ubagan river, a right tributary of the Tobol, from south to north. Kushmurun is fed by snow. To the southwest of Kushmurun rises the Amankaragai forested massif.

The bottom of Kushmurun is flat and has thick strata of clay and loam sediments covered with layers of silt. The water has a greenish-yellow color. During the high water period in the spring it is fresh and suitable for drinking. But it becomes saline the rest of the year.

Fauna
Kushmurun lake was a refuge for aquatic birds and waders that used to thrive in the formerly extensive reedbeds of the lakeshore. Nowadays, however, the reed cover has diminished to the point where almost all of the shoreline consists of muddy shoals.
Among the fish species found in the waters of the lake, bream, perch and carp are worth mentioning.

See also
List of lakes of Kazakhstan

References

External links

Shalkar-Nura -Tourism

Lakes of Kazakhstan
Kostanay Region